The 2017 Presbyterian Blue Hose football team represented Presbyterian College in the 2017 NCAA Division I FCS football season. They were led by first-year head coach Tommy Spangler, who was in his second stint as PC head coach, as he coached the Blue Hose from 2001–06. The Blue Hose played their home games at Bailey Memorial Stadium and as a member of the Big South Conference. They finished the season 4–7, 1–4 in Big South play to finish in fifth place.

Previous season

The Blue Hose kicked off the 2016 season with three away games: they fell to Central Michigan and No. 6 Chattanooga to open 0–2, but rebounded with a 31–14 win against Campbell. The Blue Hose's first home game ended with a shock upset as Presbyterian fell 7–28 to No. 19 (Division II) Florida Tech. They traveled to Gardner–Webb next, losing by 21. Their second win of the season came at home against Monmouth, as a late goal line stand helped them win 17–13. That game proved to be Presbyterian's last win, however, as the Blue Hose dropped five straight against Charleston Southern, Coastal Carolina, Liberty, Kennesaw State, and South Alabama. On December 20, just over a month after the Blue Hose concluded a 2–9 season, head coach Harold Nichols resigned, and several days later Tommy Spangler was promoted for his second stint as PC head coach.

Roster

Schedule

Source

Game summaries

at Wake Forest

The Citadel

Campbell

Cumberland (TN)

Wofford

Saint Francis

Charleston Southern

Kennesaw State

at Monmouth

at Liberty

Gardner–Webb

References

Presbyterian
Presbyterian Blue Hose football seasons
Presbyterian Blue Hose football